The 1751 Port-au-Prince earthquake occurred at 12:50 UTC on 21 November in French Haiti, followed by a tsunami. Another earthquake was reported at the same location on 15 September of the same year and it is uncertain whether the two reports refer to the same event.

Seismological analysis
Later seismologists attributed the 1751 earthquake, like that of 1910, to adjustments along the Southern Trough.

References

Earthquakes in Haiti
Port-au-prince Earthquake, 1751
Port-au-prince Earthquake, 1751
18th century in Haiti